Gabriele Mirabassi is an Italian jazz clarinetist.

Career

He was born in Perugia and is a graduate of the Morlacchi Conservatory. His teacher told him avoid playing jazz because it would damage his technique, so at home he learned jazz on the piano, playing along to his father's records. In his teens he performed locally on piano. He has been a member of the Rabih Abou-Khalil group. In 2013, he performed with harpist Edmar Castañeda at festivals in France and at a choro event in Brazil.

Discography 
 Fiabe (Egea, 1995)
 Cambaluc (Egea, 1997)
 Velho Retrato (Egea, 1999)
 Lo Stortino (Egea, 2000)
 Luna Park  (Egea, 2000)
 1–0 (Una a Zero) (Egea, 2001)
 Fuori le Mura, (Egea, 2003)
 Graffiando Vento (Dunya, 2007)
 Canto di Ebano (Egea, 2008)
 Chamber Songs (CAM Jazz, 2019)

With Rabih Abou-Khalil
 The Cactus of Knowledge (Enja, 2001)
 Morton's Foot (Enja, 2003)

References

1967 births
Living people
People from Perugia
21st-century clarinetists
Italian clarinetists
Italian jazz musicians